Willy Roggeman (born Ninove, 9 June 1934) is a Belgian writer and jazz musician.

Bibliography
 De adem van de jazz (1961)
 Het goudvisje (1962)
 Blues voor glazen blazers (1964)
 Yin/Yang (1964)
 Literair labo (1965)
 Jazzologie 1940-1965 (1966)
 Nardis (1966)
 De axolotl (1967)
 Het zomers nihil (1967)
 Catch as catch can (1968)
 Free en andere jazz-essays (1969)
 De ringen van de kinkhoorn (1970)
 Homoïostase (1971)
 Made of words (1972)
 Indras (1973)
 Gnomon (1975)
 De goddelijke hagedisjes (1978)
 Lithopedia (1979)
 Glazuur op niets (1981)
 Glazuur op niets (1981)
 Postumiteiten (1996)
 De gedichten 1953-2002 (2004)

Awards
 1962 - Leo de Kreynprijs
 1965 - Arkprijs van het Vrije Woord
 1971 - Bijzondere prijs van de Jan Campertstichting
 1982 - Belgische staatprijs voor literatuur

See also
 Flemish literature

References
 Willy Roggeman
 G.J. van Bork en P.J. Verkruijsse, De Nederlandse en Vlaamse auteurs (1985)

External links
 www.nederlandseliteratuur.ugent.be/home/WillyRoggeman

1934 births
Flemish writers
Living people
Ark Prize of the Free Word winners